Uncle Sam, was a side-wheel paddle steamer and the first steamboat on the Colorado River in 1852.

It had been built in June 1852 in San Francisco by Domingo Marcucci and disassembled for shipment. Equipped with only a  engine, Uncle Sam could only carry 35 tons of supplies, taking 15 days to make the first  trip.

Uncle Sam made many trips up and down the river for four months to finish carrying all the supplies for the fort, improving its time up river to 12 days. Negligence caused it to sink at its dock below Fort Yuma, and was then washed away and lost before it could be raised, in the spring flood of 1853. Turnbull who meanwhile had returned to the Delta from San Francisco with another cargo and a more powerful engine for the Uncle Sam. He returned to San Francisco, for a new hull, while the army sent wagons to recover the cargo from the delta again. However, Turnbull in financial difficulty, disappeared from the city leaving creditors unpaid. Nevertheless, Turnbull had shown the worth of steamboats to solve Fort Yuma's supply problem.

References

Steamboats of the Colorado River
Sidewheel steamboats of California
Merchant ships of the United States
Ships built in San Francisco
1852 ships